Angel dust may refer to:

Common uses
 A common name for the drug  phencyclidine (PCP)
 Angel dusting, a misleading marketing practice

Comics and videos
 Angel Dust (comics), a fictional mutant
 Angel Dust, a manga by Kouta Hirano
 Angel/Dust, a 2000 manga by Aoi Nanase
 Angel Dust (character), in the animated web series Hazbin Hotel

Films
 Angel Dust (film), a 1994 film by Japanese director Gakuryū Ishii

Music
 Angel Dust (Faith No More album)
 Angel Dust (German band), a German heavy metal band
 Angel Dust (American band), an American rock supergroup
 Angeldust (band), an American industrial music project
 Angel Dust (Blutengel album)
 Angel Dust (Indo G album), 1998
 Angel Dust (Z-Ro album), 2012
 "Angel Dust", a song by Tim Scott
 "Angel Dust", a song by Gil Scott-Heron and Brian Jackson from the 1978 album Secrets
 "Angel Dust", a song by Venom from the 1981 album Welcome to Hell
 "Angel Dust", a song by Loudness on the 1982 album Devil Soldier
 "Angel Dust", a song by New Order on the 1986 album Brotherhood
 "Angel Dust", a song by Mac Miller from the 2014 mixtape Faces
 "Angel Dust",  a song by Azahriah released in 2021

See also
 Dust of Angels, a 1992 film